The Larichmore Viaduct is a railway viaduct in Scotland that carries the West Highland Line over the Brunery Burn.

History

It was listed as a Category B listed building in 1980.

Design
The viaduct crosses the Brunery Burn close to the A830 road.

References

Sources
 

Railway bridges in Scotland
Listed bridges in Scotland
Lochaber
Bridges in Highland (council area)
Bridges completed in 1901
1901 establishments in Scotland